Racotis is a genus of moths in the family Geometridae. The genus was erected by Frederic Moore in 1887.

Species
Some species of this genus are:
Racotis anaglyptica Prout 1935
Racotis angulosa Herbulot, 1973
Racotis apodosima Prout, 1931
Racotis boarmiaria Guenée 1858
Racotis breijeri (Prout, 1922)
Racotis canui Herbulot, 1991
Racotis cedrici Herbulot, 1998
Racotis cogens Prout 1929
Racotis deportata Herbulot, 1970
Racotis discistigmaria Hampson 1902
Racotis incauta (Prout, 1916)
Racotis incompletaria (Guenée, 1862)
Racotis inconclusa Walker 1860
Racotis maculata Lucas 1889
Racotis monognampta Prout 1937
Racotis neonephria Prout 1935
Racotis sordida Warren 1896
Racotis squalida (Butler, 1878)
Racotis submuscaria Pagenstecher 1900
Racotis zebrina Warren, 1899

References

Encyclopedia of Life

Boarmiini
Geometridae genera